Kanye is a village in southern Botswana, located  south-west of the capital, Gaborone. There is an increase comparing to the 45,196 of the 2011 census, making it the ninth-largest village in the country. Kanye is the traditional capital of the Ngwaketse tribe, who first settled in the area in the 1790s. The village is the longest continuously occupied tribal capital in the country.

Geography
Kanye lies on a series of hills which form a natural protective barrier against the sands of the Kalahari Desert. The hills extend into the Bushveld region of South Africa. There is a deep natural gorge (called Kanye Gorge) close to the village, which was reputedly used as a hiding place for villagers during the various conflicts of the 19th century.

History
Kanye was established in the 1790s by Makaba, the paramount chief of the Ngwaketse (a tribe of the larger Tswana people). He moved his tribe to Kanye after losing a battle to the nearby Kwena tribe, fortifying an existing hill (Kanye Hill) with stone walls. In about 1798, Kanye was attacked by an alliance of Rolong and Griquas, but the Ngwaketse were able to repulse the attack and kill their opponents' leader. European traders and hunters began visiting Kanye in the early 19th century, but it was not until the reign of Gaseitsiwe (who became chief of the Ngwaketse in 1845) that they began to actually settle in the area. In 1852, Joseph McCabe, a British trader, crossed the Kalahari Desert from south to north, beginning in Kanye and ending at Lake Ngami.

In June 1854, Robert Moffat passed through Kanye on his way north to the lands of the Matabele. He and his party found the town "completely destroyed as a result of the wars with the Boers", with the Ngwaketse living in the ruins. By the 1860s, Kanye had been rebuilt and was prospering as a trading centre for ivory, animal skins, and ostrich feathers. Although Kanye had received semi-regular visits from missionaries, a formal mission was not established until 1871, when the London Missionary Society sent a representative. In 1887, following the establishment of the Bechuanaland Protectorate in 1885, a small British-run police station was established. In 1899, during the Second Boer War, the Ngwaketse allied with the British, with Kanye at one stage hosting a 500-strong column under the command of Colonel Herbert Plumer. In the early 20th century, Kanye became the first village in the Bechuanaland Protectorate to introduce irrigation projects and public standpipes. An asbestos mine opened in the 1920s. Former Vice-President and 2nd President of Botswana, Quett Masire was born in Kanye on 24 July 1926 and was buried in his home village after his death on 22 June 2017.

Kanye Wards 
The village is divided into several wards. Each ward has a kgosana which is responsible for the cultural administration of the ward. The wards are further divided into small divisions that have headsmen. The following are some of the wards found in Kanye which are further divided into small wards

 Ntsweng
 Tloung
 Kgwatlheng
 Mongala
 Goolobeko
 Gasebako
 Kgatleng
 Sebego
 Gooruele
 Gookgano

Major facilities 

 National Food Technology Research Centre
 Mmakgodumo Dam
 Kanye education Centre
 Kanye Bridge
 Seepapitso Senior Secondary School
 Kanye Seventh Day Adventist Hospital

Government
Kanye and the surrounding area are divided into two parliamentary constituencies, Kanye North and Kanye South, both of which elect a single member to the National Assembly. During the general elections  held in on 23 October 2019 to elect  Member of Parliament  and local government councillors, Hon. Thapelo H. Letsholo was elected as a member of parliament for Kanye North while Hon. Dr. L. Kwape was elected as member of parliament for Kanye South. The MPs are  both for the Botswana Democratic Party.  At the 2014 general election, Kanye North was won by Patrick Ralotsia of the Botswana Democratic Party and Kanye South was won by Abram Kesupile of the Umbrella for Democratic Change.

Kanye Economy 
Kanye is an urban village   due to its population size and the definitions of  a village as defined in the 2011 Population and Housing Census Report.  A village is a settlement officially designated as such and has the Tribal Administration, the district Administration and the District Council. The village also has a tribal authority (a Chief, a Tribal Authority, ii Chief’s Representative or Headman) and availability of certain facilities such as schools, clinics or health centres, Police offices, water reticulation, etc.

Transportation
The main method of transport in and out of Kanye is via the highway system. Kanye is directly connected to Gaborone through the A10 road, and the A2 highway also passes through the village. The A2 forms part of the Trans-Kalahari Corridor, linking Walvis Bay, Namibia, with Pretoria, South Africa. Kanye is additionally served by Kanye Airport , which is one of only two airports in Southern District (along with the private Jwaneng Airport, which services the Jwaneng diamond mine).

Notable people
 Quett Masire, former President of Botswana from 1980 to 1998
 Archibald Mogwe, former Foreign Minister of Botswana from 1974 to 1985
 Banjo Mosele, singer-songwriter who has toured with Hugh Masekela
 'Makabelo Mosothoane, cabinet minister in Lesotho
 Barolong Seboni, poet and columnist for the Botswana Guardian
 Kgotso Tshenyego, author and television host

References

Populated places in Botswana
District capitals in Botswana
Southern District (Botswana)
1790s establishments in Africa